Ohio is an unincorporated community in Hamilton County, in the U.S. state of Texas.

History
A post office called Ohio was established in 1882, and remained in operation until 1920. The community was named after the state of Ohio. Little remains of the original town.

References

Unincorporated communities in Hamilton County, Texas
Unincorporated communities in Texas